Miss Sherlock (ミス・シャーロック) is a female-led adaptation of Sir Arthur Conan Doyle's Sherlock Holmes detective stories. The show is primarily set in Tokyo, Japan. It is a co-production between HBO Asia and Hulu Japan. Both the main characters, based on Sherlock Holmes and Dr. John Watson, are played by women, Yuko Takeuchi and Shihori Kanjiya respectively and it is the first major series to cast a woman as Holmes-like detective.

Premise
Miss Sherlock depicts "consulting detective" Sara "Sherlock" Shelly Futaba (Yūko Takeuchi) solving various mysteries in modern-day Tokyo. Sherlock is assisted by her flatmate, Dr. Wato Tachibana (Shihori Kanjiya), a doctor who has recently returned from volunteering medical aid in Syria. Because of Sherlock's keen observational and deduction skills, she is frequently asked by Inspector Gentaro Reimon of the Metropolitan Police to help with cases.

Although the series depicts a variety of crimes and perpetrators, Sherlock must deal with the secret organization, Stella Maris, who is behind some of the crimes they solve. Other recurring characters include Kimi Hatano, the landlady where Sherlock lives, and Kento Futaba, the Prime Minister Secretary and Sherlock's older brother.

As the first major series to cast both leads as female, it has received praise for this choice. Yukiyoshi Ozawa, who plays Sherlock's older brother, said "I'm not trying to offend any guys, but some types of guys think very square. Women are more sensitive and know how to touch people's hearts, so they know how to win the game. I think they make better private detectives."

Cast and characters

Main
 Yūko Takeuchi as Sara "Sherlock" Shelly Futaba, a brilliant yet erratic consulting detective. She frequently is asked by the Metropolitan Police for help with their investigations. The character is based on Sherlock Holmes from the novels, but takes most inspiration from the BBC series Sherlock, starring Benedict Cumberbatch. 
 Shihori Kanjiya as Dr. Wato ("Wato-san") Tachibana, a doctor who recently returned from volunteering medical aid in Syria. After the hotel she was temporarily staying in burns down, she is forced to move in with Sherlock. The character is based on Dr. Watson from the novels.
 Kenichi Takitō as Inspector Gentaro Reimon, a detective working for the Metropolitan Police Department. The character is based on Inspector Lestrade from the novels.
 Tomoya Nakamura as Sergeant Tatsuya Shibata, a police officer who works under Inspector Reimon. This is an original character.
 Yukiyoshi Ozawa as Kento Futaba, the Prime Minister's Secretary and Sherlock's older brother. He also works in the Cabinet Intelligence and Research Office. The character is based on Mycroft Holmes from the novels.
 Ran Ito as Kimi Hatano, the landlady of Sherlock's building and a family friend of Sherlock. The character is based on Mrs. Hudson from the novels.

Recurring
 Ryohei Otani as Toru Moriya, a war photographer.
 Yuki Saito as Mariko Irikawa, a psychological counselor who is counseling Wato and Moriya. She is also the main antagonist revealed with an alias "Stella Maris".

Additional cast members 
 Kei Tanaka as Toshio Yoneyama (ep. 3)

Episodes

Reception
Kate Burtyl of Den of Geek rated the show 3.5/5 and called it "worth a watch for any fan of Sherlock Holmes, Sherlock, or international TV." Kevin Yeoman of Screen Rant praised the relationship between the two leads and called the show "a satisfying binge-watch for HBO subscribers." Kristina Manente of Polygon recommended the show and said "Self-professed Sherlockians dig Miss Sherlock. Global audiences dig Miss Sherlock. And if you don’t mind ditching the deerstalker, you might love Miss Sherlock, too."

References

External links
 

HBO Asia original programming
Sherlock Holmes television series
Japanese drama television series
2018 Japanese television series debuts
2018 Japanese television series endings
Television shows set in Tokyo
Hulu Japan